DZRH Hataw was a public service program of AM station DZRH in the Philippines. It aired from 1999 to 2011. It was hosted by Deo Macalma and Ruth Abao every Monday to Saturday. The program was also simulcast over Radyo Natin, several Hot FM stations and RHTV nationwide.

See also
DZRH

References

Philippine radio programs
1999 radio programme debuts
2011 radio programme endings